Olivier Perraudeau (born 9 November 1972) is a former French racing cyclist. He finished in last place in the 2000 Tour de France.

References

External links
 

1972 births
Living people
French male cyclists
Cyclists from Pays de la Loire
Sportspeople from Vendée